The 1st constituency of Moselle is a French legislative constituency in the Moselle département.

Description

The 1st Constituency of Moselle includes a small part of the city of Metz as well as the towns to its north such as Maizières-lès-Metz and Woippy.

Since 1988 the seat has swung between the major parties of left and right. In 2012 Gérard Terrier replaced
Aurélie Filippetti following her appointment to the government as Minister of Culture a position which she held under the premiership of both Jean-Marc Ayrault and Manuel Valls.

Historic Representation

Election results

2022 

 
 
|-
| colspan="8" bgcolor="#E9E9E9"|
|-

2017

2012

 
 
 
 
 
|-
| colspan="8" bgcolor="#E9E9E9"|
|-

Sources
Official results of French elections from 2002: "Résultats électoraux officiels en France" (in French).

1